Iván García (18 April 1947 – 10 January 1993) was a Venezuelan footballer. He played in five matches for the Venezuela national football team from 1975 to 1981. He was also part of Venezuela's squad for the 1975 Copa América tournament.

References

External links
 

1947 births
1993 deaths
Venezuelan footballers
Venezuela international footballers
Place of birth missing
Association football forwards
Deportivo Italia players
Estudiantes de Mérida players
20th-century Venezuelan people